Stromal antigen 3 is a protein that in humans is encoded by the STAG3 gene.  STAG3 protein is a component of a cohesin complex that regulates the separation of sister chromatids specifically during meiosis.  STAG3 appears to participate in sister-chromatid cohesion throughout the meiotic process in human oocytes.

A homozygous 1-bp deletion inducing a frameshift mutation in STAG3 causes premature ovarian failure.

References

Further reading 

 
 
 
 
 
 
 

Genes on human chromosome 7